{{DISPLAYTITLE:C3H2}}
The molecular formula C3H2 (molar mass: 38.05 g/mol, exact mass: 38.0157 u) may refer to:

 Cyclopropenylidene, an aromatic carbene
 Cyclopropyne, the cyclic analog of an alkyne